Air India Limited is a wholly owned subsidiary of the Tata Group. It is headquartered at the Airlines House in New Delhi.

It was previously a central public sector undertaking under the ownership of Ministry of Civil Aviation. It was incorporated on 30 March 2007 as the National Aviation Company of India Limited to oversee the merger of Air India, Indian Airlines and Alliance Air. It was renamed as Air India Limited on 26 October 2010.

Air India Limited was privatized through its sale to the Tata Group. On 8 October 2021 Tata Sons paid   to Government of India and Tata will also assume  of Air India Limited's debt as per the transfer deal. The remaining  of Air India Limited's debt was also transferred to AIAHL.

The Tata Group requested approval from the CCI to merge AirAsia India with Air India Limited in April 2022, which was granted on 14 June 2022.

Structure

Previous

Current

Upon completion of remaining stake sale in AirAsia India by AirAsia Bhd on 2 November 2022 there is now one primary airline, Air India, with two divisions (AirAsia India and Air India Express) carriers providing low-cost point-to-point services.

On 29 November 2022 Tata Group and Singapore Airlines announced that Vistara will be merged with Air India limited by Mar 2024. Singapore Airlines will hold 25.1% in merged entity.

References

External links
 

Air India
Indian companies established in 2007
Companies based in Mumbai
Airline holding companies
Tata Sons subsidiaries
Formerly government-owned companies of India